Virginie C. R. Lachaume Andrieux (born , in Martigues) is a French female weightlifter, competing in the 53 kg category and representing France at international competitions.

She participated at the 2004 Summer Olympics in the 53 kg event. 
She competed at world championships, most recently at the 2011 World Weightlifting Championships.

Major results

Andrieux also competed in the 2009 European Weightlifting Championship.

References

External links
 

1980 births
Living people
French female weightlifters
Weightlifters at the 2004 Summer Olympics
Olympic weightlifters of France
People from Martigues
Sportspeople from Bouches-du-Rhône
21st-century French women